In number theory, Vantieghems theorem is a primality criterion. It states that a natural number n(n≥3) is prime if and only if

Similarly, n is prime, if and only if the following congruence for polynomials in X holds:

or:

Example 
Let n=7 forming the product 1*3*7*15*31*63 = 615195.  615195 = 7 mod 127 and so 7 is prime
Let n=9 forming the product 1*3*7*15*31*63*127*255 = 19923090075.  19923090075 = 301 mod 511  and so 9 is composite

References
 . An article with proof and generalizations.
 

Factorial and binomial topics
Modular arithmetic
Theorems about prime numbers